Josh Tatupu (born 6 November 1986) is a New Zealand-born Samoan rugby league and rugby union footballer. It was announced on 31 March 2011 that Tatupu had signed for Aviva Premiership side Exeter Chiefs.

Career
Tatupu started playing Rugby league for Australian Rugby League outfit Melbourne Storm before transferring to Rugby Union to join Super Rugby side Western Force.

Tatupu made his debut for the Western Force in 2008 against the Lions in Johannesburg. Tatupu is also a former league player having represented Samoa. After leaving Western Force he joined Otago in the NPC before joining French side Castres. It was announced on 31 March 2011 that Tatupu will join English side Exeter Chiefs.

On 16 May 2013 French Pro D2 side US Carcassonne side announced on their official website that they had signed Tatupu on a two-year deal.

References

External links
Aviva Premiership Player Profile

1986 births
Living people
Baroudeurs de Pia XIII players
Expatriate rugby league players in Australia
Expatriate rugby union players in England
Expatriate rugby union players in France
New Zealand expatriate rugby league players
New Zealand expatriate rugby union players
New Zealand expatriate sportspeople in Australia
New Zealand expatriate sportspeople in England
New Zealand expatriate sportspeople in France
New Zealand sportspeople of Samoan descent
New Zealand rugby league players
New Zealand rugby union players
Otago rugby union players
Samoa national rugby league team players
Samoa international rugby union players
Western Force players
US Carcassonne players